Murnaghan is a surname of Northern Irish origin, which means "loveable". The name may refer to:

Dermot Murnaghan (born 1957), British journalist
Francis Dominic Murnaghan (mathematician) (1893–1976), Irish mathematician
Francis Dominic Murnaghan, Jr. (1920–2000), American judge
George Murnaghan (1847–1929), Irish politician
Sarah Murnaghan (born 2002), American transplant recipient
Sheelagh Murnaghan (1924–1993), British politician

Other uses
Birch–Murnaghan equation of state
Murnaghan–Nakayama rule
Murnaghan equation of state
Murnaghan (programme)

See also
Monaghan (disambiguation)

References

Surnames of British Isles origin